Maksim Kasarab (born 10 June 2003) is a Belarusian footballer who plays for Minsk.

References

External links

2003 births
Living people
Belarusian footballers
Association football defenders
FC Minsk players
Belarusian Premier League players